Rustin Ray "Rusty" Kimsey (June 20, 1935 – April 10, 2015) was an American prelate of the Episcopal Church who served as the fifth bishop of the Episcopal Diocese of Eastern Oregon between 1980 and 2000.

Early Life and Education
Kimsey was born on June 20, 1935 in Bend, Oregon, the son of Lauren Chamness Kimsey and Lois Elena Moorhead. He was a sixth-generation Oregonian. He was educated at the public schools in Bend, Oregon and Hermiston, Oregon and then attended the University of Oregon from where he earned a Bachelor of Science in 1957. He then went on to study at the Episcopal Theological Seminary in Cambridge, Massachusetts from where he graduated with a Bachelor of Divinity in 1960.

Ordained Ministry
Kimsey was ordained deacon in 1960 and priest on December 18, 1960 by Bishop Lane W. Barton of Eastern Oregon. He initially served as vicar of St John's Church in Hermiston, Oregon between 1960 and 1961 and then priest-in-charge of St Paul's Church in Nyssa, Oregon in 1961. From 1961 he was vicar of St Alban]s Church in Albany, Oregon, while in 1967 he became rector of St Stephen's Church. In 1971 he became rector of St Paul's Church in The Dalles, Oregon where he remained until 1980.

Episcopacy
On March 22, 1980, Kimsey was elected on the third ballot as the Bishop of Eastern Oregon. He was consecrated on Augist 4, 1980 by Presiding Bishop John Allin at The Dalles High School Kurtz Gymnasium. Between 1994 and 2000 he chaired the Episcopal Church’s Commission on Ecumenical Relations and was instrumental in bringing about the full communion between the Episcopal Church and the Evangelical Lutheran Church in America. He retired as Bishop of Eastern Oregon in June 2000. In 2005 became Assisting Bishop of the Navajoland Area Mission, and retained the post until July 2006. In 2009 he accepted his appointment as Assisting Bishop of Alaska and remained there until 2010. 2010. He died on April 10, 2015 in The Dalles, Oregon.

See also
 List of bishops of the Episcopal Church in the United States of America

References

1935 births
2015 deaths
Bishops in Oregon
People from Bend, Oregon
Episcopal Church in Oregon
20th-century American Episcopalians
Episcopal bishops of Alaska
Episcopal bishops of Eastern Oregon